Yset or Kvikne is a village in Tynset Municipality in Innlandet county, Norway. The mountain village is located near the mountain pass that lies between the large Østerdalen valley and Trøndelag county. Norwegian National Road 3 passes through the village.

The Norwegian author Bjørnstjerne Bjørnson was born at the Bjørgan parsonage in Kvikne.

Vollan gård in Kvikne is the site of the national park center for the nearby Forollhogna National Park. The farm was the site for filming of the movie Secondløitnanten in 1993.

References

External links 
Kvikne 

Tynset
Villages in Innlandet